Verrucaria is a large genus of lichens in the family Verrucariaceae. , Species Fungorum (in the Catalog of Life) accepts 149 species in the genus. Historically, many more taxa than this have been placed in genus Verrucaria at some time in their taxonomic history. For example, the nomenclatural authority Index Fungorum has 4127 taxa with the genus name Verrucaria, including species, varieties, and forms.

A

Verrucaria acrotella 
Verrucaria adguttata 
Verrucaria aethiobola 
Verrucaria aethioboliza 
Verrucaria ahlesiana 
Verrucaria ahtii  – Finland, Lithuania, Russia, Switzerland
Verrucaria alborimosa  – Australia
Verrucaria allantoidea  – Japan
Verrucaria alpigena 
Verrucaria andesiatica 
Verrucaria antepotens  – Nepal
Verrucaria anziana 
Verrucaria aquatilis 
Verrucaria aranensis 
Verrucaria aspecta 
Verrucaria aucklandica 
Verrucaria australiensis  – Australia
Verrucaria austroalpina  – Australia

B

Verrucaria bernaicensis 
Verrucaria bernardinensis 
Verrucaria bifurcata  – Finland
Verrucaria breussii 
Verrucaria bryoctona 
Verrucaria bubalina  – Macquarie Island
Verrucaria buelliicola  – Australia
Verrucaria bulbalina  – Macquarie Island
Verrucaria bulgarica

C

Verrucaria calkinsiana 
Verrucaria canella 
Verrucaria capitulata 
Verrucaria carbonusta  – United States
Verrucaria cavernarum  – Finland
Verrucaria cernaensis  – Europe
Verrucaria ceuthocarpa 
Verrucaria coerulea 
Verrucaria collematodes 
Verrucaria conturmatula 
Verrucaria cootapatambensis  – Australia
Verrucaria corallensis  – Australia
Verrucaria craterigera

D

Verrucaria dagolavii  – South Africa
Verrucaria degelii 
Verrucaria devensis 
Verrucaria difficilis  – Finland
Verrucaria ditmarsica 
Verrucaria dolosa 
Verrucaria durietzii

E

Verrucaria efflorescens  – Prince Edward Islands
Verrucaria elaeina 
Verrucaria elaeomelaena 
Verrucaria eminens  – China
Verrucaria epimaura  – Canada
Verrucaria erichsenii

F

Verrucaria falcata 
Verrucaria fayettensis 
Verrucaria finitima 
Verrucaria fortuita  – Rarotonga
Verrucaria funckii 
Verrucaria fuscella 
Verrucaria fusconigrescens 
Verrucaria fuscozonata  – Finland
Verrucaria fusiformis

G

Verrucaria glaucina 
Verrucaria glaucovirens 
Verrucaria gongshanensis  – China

H

Verrucaria halizoa  – Europe
Verrucaria halochlora  – Japan
Verrucaria hochstetteri 
Verrucaria honghensis  – China
Verrucaria howensis  – Australia
Verrucaria humida 
Verrucaria hydrela 
Verrucaria hydrophila  – Europe

I

Verrucaria inconstans  – Australia
Verrucaria incrassata 
Verrucaria inquilina  – Australia
Verrucaria internigrescens 
Verrucaria inverecundula  – Europe
Verrucaria italica 
Verrucaria izuensis

J

Verrucaria juankoskiensis  – Europe
Verrucaria juglandis  – Armenia

K

Verrucaria kiskoensis  – Europe
Verrucaria kiyosumiensis  – Japan
Verrucaria knowlesiae 
Verrucaria kootenaica  – United States
Verrucaria kuusamoensis  – Finland

L

Verrucaria lactea  – Nepal
Verrucaria lapidicola 
Verrucaria lapponica  – Finland
Verrucaria latebrosa 
Verrucaria latericola 
Verrucaria luchunensis  – China

M

Verrucaria macrostoma 
Verrucaria maculicarpa 
Verrucaria madida  – Europe
Verrucaria margacea 
Verrucaria mawsonii 
Verrucaria meridionalis  – Australia
Verrucaria microsporoides 
Verrucaria miyagiensis  – Japan
Verrucaria modica  – Europe
Verrucaria mollis 
Verrucaria mundula  – Australia
Verrucaria muralis 
Verrucaria murina

N

Verrucaria nigrescens 
Verrucaria nodosa  – Europe
Verrucaria nujiangensis  – China

O

Verrucaria ochrostoma 
Verrucaria othmarbreussii  – Finland
Verrucaria othmarii 
Verrucaria oulankaensis  – Finland

P

Verrucaria pachyderma 
Verrucaria parvipeltata  – Nepal
Verrucaria paulula 
Verrucaria phaeoderma  – Australia
Verrucaria phaeosperma 
Verrucaria pinguicula 
Verrucaria placida  – Europe
Verrucaria placodioides  – Kerguelen Islands
Verrucaria placynthii  – Greenland
Verrucaria pluviosilvestris  – Australia
Verrucaria polysticta 
Verrucaria praetermissa 
Verrucaria praeviella  – Japan
Verrucaria prominula 
Verrucaria psychrophila 
Verrucaria puncticulata  – Australia

Q

Verrucaria quercina

R

Verrucaria raesaenenii  – Europe
Verrucaria rhizicola  – France
Verrucaria rosula  – Europe
Verrucaria rupestris

S

Verrucaria saanaensis  – Finland
Verrucaria sandstedei 
Verrucaria sanrikuensis  – Japan
Verrucaria schofieldii  – Canada
Verrucaria senta  – Nepal
Verrucaria serpuloides  – Antarctica
Verrucaria sessilis  – New Zealand
Verrucaria simplex  – Europe
Verrucaria solicola  – Australia
Verrucaria squamulosa  – Europe
Verrucaria subdiscreta  – Australia
Verrucaria subdevergens  – Finland
Verrucaria subdivisa 
Verrucaria sublapponica  – Finland
Verrucaria sublobulata 
Verrucaria subtholocarpa

T

Verrucaria takagoensis  – Japan
Verrucaria tallbackaensis  – Europe
Verrucaria tasmanica  – Australia
Verrucaria tenebrosa 
Verrucaria tesselatula 
Verrucaria thalassina 
Verrucaria tholocarpa  – Australia
Verrucaria thujae  – North America
Verrucaria tuberculiformis

V

Verrucaria vacillans  – Finland
Verrucaria viridula 
Verrucaria vitikainenii  – Finland

X

Verrucaria xyloxena

Y

Verrucaria yoshimurae  – Japan

References

Verrucaria
Verrucaria